The Blue Dragon Film Award for Best Director is one of the awards that is presented annually at the Blue Dragon Film Awards by Sports Chosun, which is typically held at the end of the year.

Winners and nominees

1960s

1970s

1990s

2000s

2010s

2020s

References

General references

External links 
  
 

Blue Dragon Film Awards